"Take It from Me" is a song co-written and recorded by Canadian country music artist Paul Brandt. It was released in March 1997 as the fourth and final single from his album Calm Before the Storm.  The song reached number 38 on the Billboard Hot Country Singles & Tracks chart and number 1 on the Canadian RPM Country Tracks chart.  It was written by Brandt and Roy Hurd.

Chart performance

Year-end charts

References

1997 singles
Paul Brandt songs
Song recordings produced by Josh Leo
Reprise Records singles
1996 songs
Songs written by Paul Brandt